Elizabeth Fry (née Gurney; 21 May 1780 – 12 October 1845), sometimes referred to as Betsy Fry was an English prison reformer, social reformer, philanthropist and Quaker. Fry was a major driving force behind new legislation to improve the treatment of prisoners, especially female inmates, and as such has been called the "Angel of Prisons". She was instrumental in the 1823 Gaols Act which mandated sex-segregation of prisons and female warders for female inmates to protect them from sexual exploitation. Fry kept extensive diaries in which the need to protect female prisoners from rape and sexual exploitation is explicit.

She was supported in her efforts by Queen Victoria and by Emperors Alexander I and Nicholas I of Russia and was in correspondence with both, their wives and the Empress Mother. In commemoration of her achievements she was depicted on the Bank of England £5 note, in circulation between 2002 and 2016.

Background and early life
Elizabeth Fry was born in Gurney Court, off Magdalen Street, Norwich, into a prominent Quaker family, the Gurneys. Her childhood family home was Earlham Hall, which is now part of the University of East Anglia. Her father, John Gurney, was a partner in Gurney's Bank. Her mother, Catherine, was a member of the Barclay family who were among the founders of Barclays Bank. Her mother died when Elizabeth was twelve years old. As one of the oldest girls in the family, Elizabeth was partly responsible for the care and education of the younger children, including her brother Joseph John Gurney, a philanthropist. One of her sisters was Louisa Gurney Hoare, a writer on education.

Family life
She met Joseph Fry, a banker and a cousin of the Bristol Fry family, who was also a Quaker, when she was 20 years old. They married on 19 August 1800 at the Norwich Goat Lane Friends Meeting House and moved to St Mildred's Court in the City of London. Elizabeth Fry was recorded as a minister of the Religious Society of Friends in 1811.

Joseph and Elizabeth Fry lived in Plashet House in East Ham between 1809 and 1829, then moved to The Cedars on Portway in West Ham, where they lived until 1844.

Offspring
They had eleven children, five sons and six daughters:
 Katharine (Kitty) Fry (22 August 18019 May 1886); she wrote A History of the Parishes of East and West Ham (published posthumously, 1888). She did not marry. 
 Rachel Elizabeth Fry (25 March 18034 Dec 1888); married to Francis Cresswell.
 John Gurney Fry of Warley Lodge (18041872), married to Rachel Reynolds, whose mother was a Barclay.
 William Storrs Fry (1 June 18061844), married Juliana Pelly.
 Richenda Fry (18 February 18081884), married Foster Reynolds.
 Joseph Fry (20 September 18091896), married Alice Partridge
 Elizabeth (Betsy) Fry (18111816), died aged 5 years.
 Hannah Fry (12 September 181210 March 1895), married to William Champion Streatfeild.
 Louisa Fry (18141896), married to Raymond Pelly (brother of Juliana, William's wife).
 Samuel Fry (18161902; known as "Gurney"); married to Sophia Pinkerton who was an aunt to poet and translator Percy Edward Pinkerton.
 Daniel Fry (October 18221892; known as "Henry" or "Harry"), married to Lucy Sheppard.

Humanitarian work

Awakening concern
According to her diary, Elizabeth Fry was moved by the preaching of Priscilla Hannah Gurney, Deborah Darby, and William Savery. She had more religious feelings than her immediate family. Prompted by a family friend, Stephen Grellet, Fry visited Newgate Prison in 1813. The conditions she saw there horrified her. Newgate prison was overcrowded with women and children, some of whom had not even received a trial. The prisoners did their own cooking and washing in the small cells in which they slept on straw. Newgate was also the last stop for many before being deported to Australia in ships Fry described—in 1814, 20 years before the abolition of slavery—as little better than slave ships. She returned the following day with food and clothes for some prisoners. 

Fry was then unable to personally further her work for nearly four years because of difficulties within the Fry family, including the financial ills of the Fry bank. During the 1812 financial panic in the City of London, William Fry had lent a large amount of the bank's money to his wife's family, undermining the bank's solvency. Fry's brother John Gurney, brother-in-law Samuel Hoare III, and cousin Hudson Gurney made a large investment in the W.S. Fry & Sons bank to stabilise its situation.

Prison reform and prisoner rehabilitation
Fry returned to her project in 1816 and was eventually able to fund a prison school for the children who were imprisoned with their mothers. Rather than attempt to impose discipline on the women, she suggested rules and then asked the prisoners to vote on them. In 1817, she helped found the Association for the Reformation of the Female Prisoners in Newgate. This association provided materials for women so that they could learn to sew patchwork, which was calming and also allowed skills to develop, such as needlework and knitting which could offer employment when they were out of prison and then could earn money for themselves. This approach was copied elsewhere and led to the eventual creation of the British Ladies' Society for Promoting the Reformation of Female Prisoners in 1821. She also promoted the idea of rehabilitation instead of harsh punishment which was taken on by the city authorities in London as well as many other authorities and prisons.

The passing of the Gaols Act in 1823 had a limited effect on prison conditions. It was largely ineffective, as it contained no mechanism to ensure its provisions were followed; some institutions, such as town gaols and debtors' prisons, were not regulated by the Act. The one change which widely and successfully adopted was the separation of male from female inmates. Fry, whose ideas and representations had been influential in the drafting and passage of the Act, was well aware of the shortcomings in its implementation. She gave evidence to a Select Committee of the House of Lords in 1835, saying of prisons in England and Wales, that, despite the Gaols Act, "in many instances their condition is melancholy...they may truly be called schools for crime" and that some still had "no instruction, no employment, no classification [of inmates]...and they get into a most low and deplorable state of morals...I would not say that all are in that condition, but I fear many are". Only with the passing of the Prisons Act 1835 were prison inspectors appointed, and all gaols and prisons brought under central control.

Penal transportation
The death penalty was common for even minor offences. Initially giving what comfort she could to those facing death, Fry worked to get death sentences commuted to deportation to Australia. By 1818 Hannah Bevan, Elizabeth Pryor, Elizabeth Hanbury, and Katherine Fry were visiting convict ships, providing the female convicts comforts for the voyage, and promoting measures for the fulfilling and useful occupation for the women and education for their children. (Later, Elizabeth Pryor was censured by the Ladies' Society, after she asked the government authorities for remuneration for her years of unpaid work.)

Fry campaigned for the rights and welfare of prisoners who were being transported. The women of Newgate Prison were taken through the streets of London in open carts, often in chains, huddled together with their few possessions. They were pelted with rotten food and filth by the people of the city. The fear was often enough to make women condemned to transportation riot on the evening before. Fry persuaded the Governor of the prison to send the women in closed carriages and spare them this last indignity before transportation, with Fry and the other women of the Ladies' Society accompanying those transports to the docks. She visited prison ships and persuaded captains to implement systems to ensure each woman and child would at least get a share of food and water on the long journey. Later she arranged each woman to be given packages of material and sewing tools so that they could use the long journey to make quilts and have something to sell as well as useful skills when they reached their destination. She also included a bible and useful items such as string and knives and forks in this vital care package.

When a clergyman wrote to her from New South Wales telling her female deportees were delivered to Botany Bay and left to fend for themselves, she took this up with the authorities and ensured that not only were female barracks built in Parramatta but also that appropriate transportation by boat for the 16 miles from Botany Bay to Parramatta was in place.

Fry visited 106 transport ships and saw 12,000 convicts. Her work helped to start a movement for the abolition of transportation. Transportation was officially abolished in 1837, however Elizabeth Fry was still visiting transportation ships until 1843.

Widening prison reform
Fry wrote in her book Prisons in Scotland and the North of England that she stayed the night in some of the prisons and invited nobility to come and stay and see for themselves the conditions prisoners lived in. Her kindness helped her gain the friendship of the prisoners and they began to try to improve their conditions for themselves. In 1818 Fry gave evidence to a House of Commons committee on the conditions prevalent in British prisons, becoming the first woman to present evidence in that house of Parliament.

Fry saw her friend Stephen Grellet and another Quaker, William Allen, off at the docks on their own journey in the cause of prison reform in the autumn of 1818. Having met the Emperor Alexander I in London in 1814, they travelled to visit the prisons of his empire. They had the backing of a letter from the emperor commanding his subjects to cooperate with these English Quakers. They departed for home from Odessa in July 1819. Both men wrote of this mission in their journals, where they also give accounts of their work with Fry.

In 1827, Fry visited women's prisons and other places of female confinement in Ireland. She encouraged the women of Belfast to organise their own committee to improve conditions in the women's poorhouse.

After her husband went bankrupt in 1828, Fry's brother became her business manager and benefactor. Thanks to him, her work went on and expanded. Later, in 1838, the Friends sent a party to France. Fry and her husband, as well as Lydia Irving, and abolitionists Josiah Forster and William Allen were among the people sent. They were there on other business but despite the language barrier, Fry and Lydia Irving visited French prisons.

Welfare and homelessness
Elizabeth Fry also helped the homeless, establishing a "nightly shelter" in London after seeing the body of a young boy in the winter of 1819–1820. In 1824, during a visit to Brighton, she instituted the Brighton District Visiting Society. The society arranged for volunteers to visit the homes of the poor and provide help and comfort to them. The plan was successful and was duplicated in other districts and towns across Britain.

In 1840 Fry opened a training school for nurses. Her programme inspired Florence Nightingale, who took a team of Fry's nurses to assist wounded soldiers in the Crimean War.

Slavery
After the abolition of the slave trade in the British Empire, slavery remained in European colonies. Thomas Fowell Buxton became a leader in its abolition. Elizabeth Fry in particular campaigned for abolition in Danish and Dutch colonies.

Reputation
One admirer was Queen Victoria, who granted her an audience several times before she was Queen and contributed money to her cause after she ascended to the throne. Another admirer was Robert Peel who passed several acts to further her cause including the Gaols Act 1823.

In 1842, Frederick William IV of Prussia went to see Fry in Newgate Prison during an official visit to Great Britain. The King of Prussia, who had met the social reformer during her previous tours of the continent promoting welfare change and humanitarianism, was so impressed by her work that he told his reluctant courtiers that he would personally visit the gaol when he was in London.

Death and legacy
Fry died from a stroke in Ramsgate, England, on 12 October 1845. Her remains were buried in the Friends' burial ground at Barking. Seamen of the Ramsgate Coast Guard flew their flag at half mast in respect for Fry; a practice that until this occasion had been officially reserved for the death of a ruling monarch. More than a thousand people stood in silence during the burial at the Ramsgate memorial.

Elizabeth Fry Refuge
With the intention of organising a suitable memorial to Fry, a meeting was held in June 1846, chaired by the Lord Mayor of London. Some early proposals for a statue of Fry—to be placed perhaps in either Westminster Abbey or St Paul's Cathedral—had already been floated. Instead, it was recommended to the meeting that a practical commemoration of her life would be  more fitting. Lord Ashley, amongst a group of prominent reformers and admirers of Fry, including the Bishop of Norwich and the diplomat Christian von Bunsen, promoting adoption of a charitable scheme to honour Fry, told the meeting that founding an asylum would be in "perfect harmony with her life, her character, her feelings". Such a project would stand for the nation's gratitude to her and "the sympathy they entertain for her righteous endeavours". 

The proposal met with general support and a fine 18th-century town house was purchased at 195 Mare Street, in the London Borough of Hackney and the first Elizabeth Fry refuge opened its doors in 1849. It was intended to provide temporary shelter for young women discharged from metropolitan gaols or police offices. Funding came via subscriptions from various city companies and private individuals, supplemented by income from the inmates' laundry and needlework. Such training was an important part of the refuge's work. 

In 1924, the refuge merged with the Manor House Refuge for the Destitute, in Dalston in Hackney. The hostel soon moved to larger premises in Highbury, Islington and then, in 1958, to Reading, where it remains today. The original building in Hackney became the CIU New Lansdowne Club but became vacant in 2000 and has fallen into disrepair. Hackney Council, in 2009, was leading efforts to restore the building and bring it back into use. The building did undergo substantial refurbishment work in 2012 but as of July 2013, the entire building is for sale. The building and Elizabeth Fry are commemorated by a plaque at the entrance gateway.

Memorials

There are a number of memorials which commemorate places where Fry lived. There are plaques located at her birthplace of Gurney Court in Norwich; her childhood home of Earlham Hall; St. Mildred's Court, City of London, where she lived when she was first married; and Arklow House, her final home and place of death in Ramsgate. Her name heads the list on the southern face of the Reformers Monument in Kensal Green Cemetery, London. She is depicted in stained glass at All Saints Church, Cambridge alongside Edith Cavell and Josephine Butler.

Due to her work as a prison reformer, there are several memorials to Elizabeth Fry. One of the buildings which make up the Home Office headquarters, 2 Marsham Street, is named after her. She is also commemorated in prisons and courthouses, including a terracotta bust in the gatehouse of HM Prison Wormwood Scrubs and a stone statue in the Old Bailey. The Canadian Association of Elizabeth Fry Societies honours her memory by advocating for women who are in the criminal justice system. They also celebrate and promote a National Elizabeth Fry Week in Canada each May.

Fry is also commemorated in a number of educational and care-based settings. The University of East Anglia's School of Social Work and Psychology is housed in a building named after her. There is an Elizabeth Fry Ward at Scarborough General Hospital in North Yorkshire, United Kingdom. A road is named for Fry at Guilford College, a school in Greensboro, North Carolina, which was founded by Quakers. There is a bust of Elizabeth Fry located in East Ham Library, in the London Borough of Newham.

Quakers also acknowledge Elizabeth Fry as a prominent member. Her grave at the former Society of Friends Burial Ground, located off Whiting Avenue in Barking, Essex, was restored and received a new commemorative marble plinth in October 2003. In February 2007, a plaque was erected in her honour at the Friends Meeting House in Upper Goat Lane, Norwich. Fry is also depicted in the Quaker Tapestry, on panels E5 and E6. The Elizabeth Fry room at Friends House, London, UK is named after her.

She is also honoured by other Christian denominations. In the Lady Chapel of Manchester's Anglican Cathedral, one of the portrait windows of Noble Women on the west wall of the Chapel features Elizabeth Fry. Fry is remembered in the Church of England with a commemoration on 12 October.

From 2001 to 2016, Fry was depicted on the reverse of £5 notes issued by the Bank of England. She was shown reading to prisoners at Newgate Prison. The design also incorporated a key, representing the key to the prison which was awarded to Fry in recognition of her work. However, as of 2016, Fry's image on these notes was replaced by that of Winston Churchill. She was one of the social reformers honoured on an issue of UK commemorative stamps in 1976.

There is a road in Johannesburg, South Africa named after Fry.

Fry's extensive diaries have been transcribed and studied.

Selected works
 (1827) Observations on the visiting, superintendence and government, of female prisoners Y E S
 (1831) Texts for every day in the year, principally practical & devotional
 (1841) An address of Christian counsel and caution to emigrants to newly-settled colonies

See also
 Elizabeth Fry Retreat, Melbourne, Australia
 John Howard
 Howard League for Penal Reform
 Daniel Wheeler
 Congénies
 Sarah Martin
 June Rose

References

Bibliography and further reading 
 Anderson, George M. "Elizabeth Fry: timeless reformer." America 173 (Fall 1995): 22–3.
 Clay, Walter Lowe. The Prison Chaplain. Montclair. New Jersey: Patterson Smith, 1969.
 Fairhurst, James. "The Angel of Prisons." Ireland's Own 4539 (Fall 1996):5.
 Fry, E., & Ryder, E. (1883). Elizabeth Fry: Philanthropist, preacher, prison-reformer: Life and labors / taken from the Memoir edited by her daughters, including her journal and from other sources, by Edward Ryder. Pawling, NY: P.H. Smith. MMSID 991006613419702626
 Fry, Katherine.  Memoir of the Life of Elizabeth Fry. Montclair, NJ: Patterson Smith, 1974.  2nd ed., 1848 available on Google Books.
 Hatton, Jean. Betsy, the dramatic biography of a prison reformer. Oxford UK & Grand Rapids, Michigan, Monarch Books, 2005. ( (UK),  (USA)).
 Johnson, Spencer. The Value of Kindness: The Story of Elizabeth Fry. 2nd ed. 1976.
 Kent, John (1962). Elizabeth Fry (Makers of Britain). London: Batsford. MMSID 991009174159702626
 Lewis, Georgina. Elizabeth Fry. London, England: Headley Brothers, 1909. MMSID 991013186339702626
 Pitman, E.R. Elizabeth Fry. Boston, Mass.: Roberts Brothers, 1886.
 Rose, June. Elizabeth Fry, a biography. London & Basingstoke: Macmillan, 1980. reprinted 1994 by Quaker Home Service .
 Rose, June. Prison Pioneer: The Story of Elizabeth Fry. Quaker Tapestry Booklets, 1994.
 Timpson, Thomas. Memoir of Mrs. Elizabeth Fry London: Aylott & Jones, 1847.
 Whitney, Janet. Elizabeth Fry: Quaker Heroine. London UK: George Harrap & Co. Ltd., 1937, New York, NY: Benjamin Blom, 1972.

External links

 London Borough of Hackney archives
 Elizabeth Fry on the history of social work timeline
 A sermon by Elizabeth Fry
 BBC – The five pound question: Who is Elizabeth Fry?
 Elizabeth Fry at Howard League for Penal Reform
 Elizabeth Fry Biography
 Association of Elizabeth Fry Societies Canada (Canadian societies for penal reform)
 
 Works at Open Library
 Letters from Elizabeth Fry, 1820 and 1827, State Library of New South Wales, Af 30

1780 births
1845 deaths
Anglican saints
English activists
English women activists
English suffragists
English humanitarians
English nurses
English Quakers
Elizabeth
Penal system in England
Penal system in the United Kingdom
People from Norwich (district)
People from Ramsgate
Prison reformers
19th-century Christian saints
British reformers
Christian female saints of the Late Modern era
British social reformers
19th-century English writers
19th-century English women writers
Elizabeth
Needlework
19th-century British businesspeople